Denis Ventúra (born 1 August 1995) is a Slovak professional footballer who plays as a midfielder for Sigma Olomouc.

Career

FK Senica
He made his professional debut for Senica in the Europa League qualifying away fixture against Hungarian team MTK Budapest on 5 July 2012.Senica tied the game 1:1 and Ventúra came on as a stoppage time replacement for Martin Ďurica.  He remained benched in home fixture, where Senica won 2:1, by goals of Rolando Blackburn and Jan Kalabiška, to advance on aggregate and face APOEL Nicosia. Ventúra did not appeare in those games, as Senica were knocked out by the aggregate score of 0:3.

His Corgoň Liga debut came on 26 May 2013 against Nitra. Ventúra was featured from the start, completing 80 minutes, before being replaced by Juraj Križko. Still, while on the pitch, Ventúra had witnessed Róbert Pillár's only goal of the match in the first half.

Academica Clinceni
After three-and-a-half years at iClinic Sereď, Ventúra had signed a contract with Romanian Academica Clinceni. The Academics were a top division club at that point, but at the time of Ventúra's transfer, they were second to last and it was determined, that they were set to battle in the Relegation phase during the spring. Ventúra's defensive skills were to minimise the amount of conceded goals. Ventúra joined his fellow countrymen and a striker Jakub Vojtuš, who joined the side in the summer of 2019.

Ventúra made his competitive debut in the first possible match, on 1 February 2020, against Voluntari, although he was featured in some friendly games over the winter break. In the fixture against Voluntari, Ventúra was featured in the starting line-up, playing as a defensive midfielder. While Academica took the lead through Adrian Șut, an unconverted penalty by Eugeniu Cebotaru, equaliser by Marko Simonovski and a second-half winner Mihai Căpățînă meant that Clinceni had lost 1:2. During the half-time Ventúra was replaced by Robert Ion.

Honours
FK Senica
Slovak Cup: runner-up 2014–15

 iClinic Sereď
2. Liga: 2017–18

External links
FK Senica profile
Corgoň Liga profile

References

1995 births
Living people
Sportspeople from Senica
Slovak footballers
Slovak expatriate footballers
Association football midfielders
FK Senica players
ŠKF Sereď players
LPS HD Clinceni players
Gyirmót FC Győr players
Slovak Super Liga players
Liga I players
Nemzeti Bajnokság I players
Slovak expatriate sportspeople in Romania
Expatriate footballers in Romania
Slovak expatriate sportspeople in Hungary
Expatriate footballers in Hungary
Slovakia youth international footballers
SK Sigma Olomouc players
Expatriate footballers in the Czech Republic
Slovak expatriate sportspeople in the Czech Republic